Edward Mignon (1 November 1885 – 14 May 1925) was an English first-class cricketer active 1905–1914 who played for Middlesex and Marylebone Cricket Club (MCC). He was born in Kilburn; died in Southwark.

References

1885 births
1925 deaths
English cricketers
Middlesex cricketers
Marylebone Cricket Club cricketers